Noack is a surname. Notable people with the surname include:

 Angelika Noack, German rower
 Astrid Noack, Danish sculptor
 Axel Noack, German racewalker
 Belinda Noack, Australian cricketer
 Bernd Noack, German scientist
 Eddie Noack, American country-western singer
 Friedrich Noack, German cultural historian and writer
 Fritz Noack, internationally noted pipe organ builder, born in Greifswald, Germany, in 1938, moved to USA 1958
 Harald Noack, German politician, member of the Lower Saxon Landtag 2003–08
 Hermann Noack, several people who founded and ran Noack Foundry in Germany
 Kurt Noack, German composer
 Rudolf Noack, German soccer player
 Rüdiger Noack, German Ice hockey player
 Sebastian Noack (born 1969), German baritone
 Ulrich Noack, German ice hockey player
 Ute Noack, East German cross-country skier

See also
 Noack Foundry, an art foundry in Charlottenburg, Germany, named after founder and 3 direct descendants, Hermann Noack
 Noack Organ Company
 Noack's Roundleaf Bat
 Noack volatility test